There are 120 counties in the U.S. Commonwealth of Kentucky. Despite ranking 37th in size by area, Kentucky has 120 counties, fourth among states (including Virginia's independent cities). The original motivation for having so many counties was to ensure that residents in the days of poor roads and horseback travel could make a round trip from their home to the county seat in a single day, as well as being able to travel from one county seat to the next in the same fashion. Later, however, politics began to play a part, with citizens who disagreed with their county government petitioning the state to create a new county. Today, 21 of the 120 counties have fewer than 10,000 residents, and half have fewer than 20,000. The 20 largest counties by population all have populations of 48,000 or higher, and just 7 of the 120 have a population of 100,000 or higher. The average county population, based on the estimated 2021 state population of 4.509 million, was 37,578.

Following concerns of too many counties, the 1891 Kentucky Constitution placed stricter limits on county creation, stipulating that a new county:
must have a land area of at least ;
must have a population of at least 12,000 people;
must not by its creation reduce the land area of an existing county to less than 400 square miles;
must not by its creation reduce the population of an existing county to fewer than 12,000 people;
must not create a county boundary line that passes within 10 miles (16 kilometers) of an existing county seat.
These regulations have reined in the proliferation of counties in Kentucky. Since the 1891 Constitution, only McCreary County has been legally created, in 1912. The General Assembly's creation of Beckham County in 1904 was ruled unconstitutional.

Kentucky was originally a single county in Virginia, created in 1776. In 1780, Kentucky County was divided into Fayette, Jefferson, and Lincoln counties. Kentucky was admitted as a state in 1792, when it had nine counties.

Each county has a legislative council called the fiscal court; despite the name, it no longer has any responsibility for judicial proceedings. The county judge/executive, the head of government of the county, is an ex officio member of the fiscal court and its presiding officer. Constitutionally, the fiscal court may either be composed of the magistrates for the county or of three commissioners elected from the county at large.

The largest city in Kentucky, Louisville, is a consolidated local government under KRS 67C. When the Louisville Metro government was formed, all incorporated cities in Jefferson County, apart from Louisville, retained their status as cities; however, the Louisville Metro Council is the main government for the entire county, and is elected by residents in all of Jefferson County.  The second largest, Lexington, is an urban-county government under KRS 67A. Lexington and Fayette County are completely merged and there are no separate incorporated cities within the county. In both of these counties, while Lexington and Louisville city governments govern their respective counties, a county judge/executive is still elected, as required by Kentucky's Constitution, but does not have substantive powers.

The Federal Information Processing Standard (FIPS) code, which is used by the United States government to uniquely identify counties, is provided with each entry; for Kentucky, the codes start with 21 and are completed with the three digit county code. The FIPS code for each county links to census data for that county.

Counties

|}

Clickable map
The map shown below is clickable; click on any county to be redirected to the page for that county, or use the text links shown above on this page.

See also
 List of United States counties and county equivalents
 Lists of U.S. county name etymologies
 List of cities in Kentucky

Notes

External links
Kentucky Association of Counties
County Profile Reports – Kentucky Center for Statistics
Duties of Elected County Officials – Kentucky Legislative Research Commission
National Association of Counties – Find A County

List of Kentucky counties
Kentucky, counties in
County